The Lifeline (sometimes written as The Life-Line) is a 1946 thriller novel by the British writer Phyllis Bottome. It has been suggested as a direct influence on Ian Fleming, who had once attended a school run by Bottome, and his later creation of the James Bond stories. Equally the protagonist Mark Chalmers may have been partly based on Fleming himself. It was the only spy novel written by Bottome.

Synopsis
An Eton schoolmaster heading off on his annual visit to the Austrian Alps, which has recently been annexed by Germany agrees to a casual request from a Foreign Office friend to carry a message the country. Before long he finds himself embroiled in the anti-Nazi resistance and targeted by the Gestapo.

References

Bibliography
 Buckton, Oliver. The World Is Not Enough: A Biography of Ian Fleming. Rowman & Littlefield, 2021.
 Lassner, Phyllis. British Women Writers of World War II: Battlegrounds of their Own. Springer,  1998.

1946 British novels
Novels by Phyllis Bottome
Novels set in Vienna
Novels set in the 1930s
Faber and Faber books
British spy novels
British thriller novels